Jaan Hatheli Pe  is a  1987 Indian Hindi-language action film produced by Sudesh Kumar under the Vijaya Shree Pictures banner and directed by Raghunath Jhalani. It stars Dharmendra, Hema Malini, Jeetendra, Rekha and Raj Babbar in lead roles and the music was composed by Laxmikant–Pyarelal.

Plot
Shankar Chinoy is the chairman of the underworld organization Cosmos. Once, he is assaulted by his foes and rescued by a candid Soni Kapoor. Soni loves a charming girl Mona. However, a baleful gangster Rocky forcibly prevails Mona for marriage, instead of debt. Thus, to secure Mona, Soni turns into the white knight of Chinoy. After a few years, Chinoy passes away and Soni becomes the kingpin of Cosmos. It begrudges the remaining board members. Hence, they conspire to eliminate him when in concern for pregnant Mona he decides to quit his path. The syndicate also approves his petition excluding one last task. However, his crime is witnessed by a gentleman Ram Kumar Verma who informs to Police. As a result, Soni is arrested and Mona also moves away as being bright in his profession. Soni pleads with Ram to change his evidence by affirming his story but he stands for justice. Then, angered Soni makes Ram’s life miserable, so, Inspector Khan enrolls in the Witness Protection Program for Ram & family. But Soni’s men pursued him and make gruesome attempts which leads to his father’s death. Now, Ram explodes to take avenge and returns to hit back at Soni. He succeeds in a counter-attack by seizing Mona & newborn child. At last, the battle erupts when Soni assimilates the eminence of Ram through Mona. Besides, the syndicate intrigues to slay them when the two fuse and cease the blackguards. Finally, the movie ends with the death of Soni & Mona leaving their kid’s responsibility to Ram.

Cast
Dharmendra as Soni Kapoor
Hema Malini as Mona Kapoor
Jeetendra as Ram Kumar Verma
Rekha as Geeta Verma
Raj Babbar as Inspector Khan
Kulbhushan Kharbanda as Shankar Chinoy
Shakti Kapoor as Rocky
Ranjeet as Vikram Rastholi
Madan Puri as Kantawala
Sharat Saxena as Swamy
A. K. Hangal as Ram's Father
Pinchoo Kapoor as Ghnanchand

Soundtrack
Lyrics: Anjaan

References

External links
 

1987 films
1980s Hindi-language films
Films scored by Laxmikant–Pyarelal